Procometis ochricilia is a moth in the family Autostichidae. It was described by Edward Meyrick in 1921. It is found in South Africa.

The wingspan is about 40 mm. The forewings are light yellow ochreous, somewhat paler and slightly whitish tinged towards the costa and dorsum. The hindwings are rather dark grey.

References

Endemic moths of South Africa
Moths described in 1921
Procometis
Taxa named by Edward Meyrick